Ezra Swerdlow (March 2, 1953 – January 23, 2018) was an American film producer and production manager.

In 1980, he served as a unit manager on the Woody Allen film Stardust Memories. He co-owned Schindler/Swerdlow Productions in New York.

Filmography 
He was a producer in all films unless otherwise noted.

Film

Production manager

Second unit director or assistant director

As an actor

Location management

Thanks

Television

References

External links 
 

1954 births
2018 deaths
American film directors
Place of birth missing
People from Long Island
Neurological disease deaths in Massachusetts
Deaths from motor neuron disease